John Henry Davis (January 12, 1921 – July 13, 1984)  was an American heavyweight weightlifter. Between 1938 and 1953 he was undefeated, winning two Olympic, six world and 12 national titles, and set 16 ratified world records: seven in the snatch, four in the clean and jerk, two in the press and three in the total.

Biography 
A native of Brooklyn, N.Y., Davis enlisted in 1941 and served in the U.S. Army for many years during World War II at the Pacific Theater, being able to return stateside in 1942 and 1943 to partake in championships but having to forgo in 1944 and 1945. For most of his 19-year weightlifting career he represented the York Barbell Club. He worked as an officer in the New York Department of Corrections.

Davis first gained prominence by winning the world light heavyweight crown as a 17-year-old school boy in 1938 at Vienna, Austria. He remained unbeaten until 1953, when he finished second at the world championships due to a thigh injury. At his peak, Davis held all the world records in his class, and at the 1951 national championships he became the first man to break the 400 pound barrier by lifting 402 pounds. He retired in 1956 after a devastating leg injury at the '56 Olympic trials.

John Davis died from cancer in 1984, in Albuquerque, New Mexico. He was 63 years old. He was introduced to the United States Olympic Hall of Fame in 1989.

References

External links 

 World Records and titles by John Davis
 John Davis – Hall of Fame at Weightlifting Exchange
 
 
 

1921 births
1984 deaths
American male weightlifters
American strength athletes
Sportspeople from Brooklyn
Weightlifters at the 1948 Summer Olympics
Weightlifters at the 1952 Summer Olympics
Olympic gold medalists for the United States in weightlifting
Olympic medalists in weightlifting
Medalists at the 1952 Summer Olympics
Medalists at the 1948 Summer Olympics
Pan American Games gold medalists for the United States
Pan American Games medalists in weightlifting
Weightlifters at the 1951 Pan American Games
World Weightlifting Championships medalists
Medalists at the 1951 Pan American Games
United States Army personnel of World War II
20th-century American people